Gilbert Moevi (1 September 1934 – 26 February 2022) was a French footballer. A defender, he spent his senior career with Girondins de Bordeaux from 1959 to 1967. He died on 26 February 2022, at the age of 87.

References

1934 births
2022 deaths
Sportspeople from Lomé
Togolese footballers
French footballers
Ligue 1 players
Ligue 2 players
FC Girondins de Bordeaux players